Chukwa may refer to

 the Chukwa language of Tibet
 an alleged World Turtle in Hindu mythology, see World-Tortoise (Hindu)
 a Hadoop subproject devoted to large-scale log collection and analysis. Chukwa is built on top of HDFS and MapReduce framework and inherits Hadoop's scalability and robustness.